The 2005 Bahraini Crown Prince Cup was the 5th edition of the cup tournament in men's football (soccer). This edition featured the top four sides from the Bahraini Premier League 2004-05 season.

Bracket

Bahraini Crown Prince Cup seasons
2005 domestic association football cups
2004–05 in Bahraini football